Maxfield Creek is a stream in the U.S. state of Washington.

A variant name was Mayfield Creek. The stream was named after Jesse Maxfield, an early settler.

See also
List of rivers of Washington

References

Rivers of Clallam County, Washington
Rivers of Jefferson County, Washington
Rivers of Washington (state)